Bolaji Akinola is a Nigerian maritime and corporate communication expert. He holds a Doctor of Philosophy degree in Media and Communication from the Pan-Atlantic University, Lagos and a Masters in Business Administration he obtained from Lagos Business School. 

He is an advocate for the rights of seafarers and dockworkers whom he described as the under-recognized, under-publicized and unsung economic heroes of Nigeria.

On February 8, 2021, Akinola called on the Nigerian government to give priority access to coronavirus (COVID-19) vaccines to seafarers and dockworkers in order to minimise disruption to the country’s supply and logistics chain.

Akinola also serves as the Chief Executive Officer of Nigeria’s leading maritime communication firm, Ships & Ports Communication Company Limited.

He is the author of three books namely Career and Investment Opportunities in the Maritime Sector; Arrested Development and Authority Stealing.

Akinola has been s strong advocate of Public-Private Partnership for the development of the maritime sector.

In addition to his advocacy role, Akinola serves as the Chief Executive Officer of Ships and Ports Communication Company and Spokesman of the Seaport Terminal Operators Association of Nigeria.

Education 

School of Media and Communication, Pan-Atlantic University, Lagos (PhD)

Lagos Business School (MBA)

Ladoke Akintola University of Technology, Oyo State (Masters in Transport Management).

University of Agriculture Abeokuta, Ogun State 

Occupation   Maritime/Public Relations

Years active 2000–present

Organization  Ships & Ports Communication Company

Bolaji Akinola bagged his Doctor of Philosophy (PhD) degree in Media and Communication from the Pan-Atlantic University, Ibeju-Lekki in Lagos in December 2020.

Akinola’s PhD thesis was titled Millennials, Digital Natives and the Future of Print Newspapers. The study found that Nigeria’s millennials and digital natives prefer reading news on digital platforms at the expense of printed newspapers. The extensive study argues that the cost of newspapers, location of the respondents and the inconvenience associated with acquiring newspaper copies in Nigeria contribute to the avoidance of printed copies by the millennials and digital natives.1

References

Living people
Year of birth missing (living people)